Hero (1987) is the official documentary film of the 1986 FIFA World Cup held in Mexico.

The film was narrated by Michael Caine and the music score was written by Rick Wakeman. Hero found the most success in Argentina since the focal point of the film was Diego Maradona and his role in the quarter-final match against England, more specifically the Hand of God goal and the Goal of the Century. The match and the championship were eventually won by Argentina. The film also enjoys cult status in the UK.

Distribution
West Germany: 2 July 1987
Italy: 7 June 1990 (TV premiere)
Worldwide: 27 November 2020 (FIFATV Youtube channel)

See also 
 A Special Kind of Hero

References

External links
 

FIFA World Cup official films
1986 FIFA World Cup
1987 films
Documentary films about association football
1987 documentary films
Cultural depictions of Diego Maradona
Films scored by Rick Wakeman
1980s English-language films
British sports documentary films
1980s British films